Grover Cleveland served two non-consecutive terms as President of the United States. Grover  Cleveland's cabinet may refer to:

 1st term

2nd term